A gromada is a former Polish unit of local government.
 Gromada Osiek
 Gromada Tursko Wielkie

Gromada may also refer to:
Gromada (video game), a 2000 video game
Gromada, Tomaszów Lubelski County in Lublin Voivodeship (east Poland)
Gromada, Biłgoraj County in Lublin Voivodeship (east Poland)
Thaddeus Gromada, Polish-American historian

See also
 Hramada, cognate term in Belarus
 Hromada, cognate term in Ukraine
 Hromada (disambiguation)